Mikel Rouse (born Michael Rouse; January 26, 1957 in Saint Louis, Missouri, United States) is an American composer. He has been associated with a Downtown New York City movement known as totalism, and is best known for his operas, including Dennis Cleveland, about a television talk show host, which Rouse wrote and starred in.

Music
Rouse writes music that is idiomatically and stylistically indebted to popular music, yet he uses complex rhythmic techniques derived from world music, the avant-garde and minimalism, including a technique he calls "counterpoetry" in which separate lines of a song sung by separate characters or groups are set to phrases of differing lengths (such as 9 and 10 beats) and often played over a background time signature of 4/4. Metric sleight of hand, simple in concept but often complex in perception, is common. One of the basic rhythms of Rouse's opera Failing Kansas is a five-beat isorhythm (rhythmic ostinato) against which either the harmony or drum pattern often reinforces the four- or eight-beat meter.

Life
The son of a Missouri state trooper, Rouse grew up in Poplar Bluff, in the state's Bootheel region. Early in life, he decided to change the spelling of his first name to "Mikel," to more accurately represent the name's pronunciation.  He studied painting and film at the Kansas City Art Institute as well as music at the University of Missouri–Kansas City. When the avant-garde rock band Talking Heads played in Kansas City in 1978, Rouse's band Tirez Tirez was the only local band progressive enough to open for them. Tirez Tirez relocated to New York City in 1979 and continued performing until 1987. Meanwhile, Rouse absorbed African rhythmic techniques from A. M. Jones's Studies in African Music, and studied Schillinger technique with Jerome Walman, one of the few "Certified" Schillinger Teachers in America; both influences came to inform his music. In addition to Tirez Tirez he formed a new ensemble, Mikel Rouse Broken Consort, to work out his new rhythmic language in the context of rock-based instrumentation, making him one of the first composers to notate intricate music for rock group. Rouse's association with Ben Neill and Kyle Gann in New York in the early 1990s led to the recognition of a new rhythmic complexity in minimalist-based music that came to be referred to as totalism.

Frustrated by the lack of institutional support for Downtown music, Rouse has made an ambitious bid for composer self-sufficiency. In 1995 he premiered a one-man "opera" Failing Kansas, based on the same story as Truman Capote's In Cold Blood, and in 2000 he produced an entire film with music by himself, rather pointedly titled Funding. In an opposite direction, he premiered a technologically innovative opera called Dennis Cleveland at the Kitchen in 1996, based on a talk show format and with some of the singers/actors spread out among the audience, though with a dense libretto drawn from John Ralston Saul's critique of Western society in the latter's book Voltaire's Bastards. In 2002 the opera was presented at Lincoln Center.

He collaborated with Ben Neill on The Demo, based on The Mother of All Demos, a technological demonstration of 1968. It was performed in 2015 at the Bing Concert Hall of Stanford University. He received a Foundation for Contemporary Arts Grants for Artists award (2001).

Discography
 1980 Etudes
 1983 Story of the Year
 1983 Under The Door/Sleep
 1984 Jade Tiger
 1984 Colorado Suite
 1984 Quorum
 1985 A Walk in the Woods
 1986 Set The Timer/Uptight
 1986 Social Responsibility
 1988 A Lincoln Portrait
 1988 Against All Flags
 1993 Soul Menu
 1994 Autorequiem
 1994 Living Inside Design
 1995 Failing Kansas
 1996 Dennis Cleveland: An Opera
 1999 Return
 2000 Century XXI: Electronics USA 1, with Carl Stone, Ben Neill, Kyle Gann
 2001 Funding
 2001 Cameraworld
 2005 The End of Cinematics
 2005 Music for Minorities
 2005 Test Tones
 2006 House of Fans
 2006 Love At Twenty
 2006 International Cloud Atlas, for the Merce Cunningham Dance Company
 2009 Gravity Radio
 2010 Recess
 2010 Corner Loading (vol.1)
 2012 Boost|False Doors
 2012 False Doors|Boost 
 2013 Ambulance Chaser
 2013 The Law of Average
 2013 Mayan Yours/I Dry Gin
 2013 Dawn/Tears of Joy
 2016 Take Down
 2017 Hemisphere
 2019 Swingers Castle
 2020 Community Spread

References

External links
Mikel Rouse Web Site
Kyle Gann recommended composer: Mikel Rouse

Listening
Interview with Mikel Rouse

See also
Tirez Tirez
Minimalist music
Schillinger System

1957 births
American classical composers
American male classical composers
American opera composers
Male opera composers
Kansas City Art Institute alumni
Living people